Daniel Ivanovski (Macedonian: Даниел Ивановски) (born 27 June 1983 in Socialist Republic of Macedonia) is a Macedonian football player who plays for Sölvesborgs GoIF.

Club career
Ivanovski began his career with Sileks before he then transferred to the most famous Macedonia club, FK Vardar. After a successful season, he moved to Sweden with Mjällby. Ivanovski plays as a central defender.

International career
He made his senior debut for Macedonia in a November 2005 friendly match against Iran and has earned a total of 5 caps, scoring no goals. His final international was an August 2013 friendly against Bulgaria.

References

External links
 
 Profile at MacedonianFootball 

1983 births
Living people
Association football central defenders
Macedonian footballers
FK Sileks players
FK Vardar players
Mjällby AIF players
Daniel Ivanovski
Macedonian First Football League players
Allsvenskan players
Superettan players
Daniel Ivanovski
Ettan Fotboll players
Macedonian expatriate footballers
Expatriate footballers in Sweden
Macedonian expatriate sportspeople in Sweden
Expatriate footballers in Iceland
Macedonian expatriate sportspeople in Iceland
North Macedonia international footballers